Primost is a Norwegian cheese. 
The slightly brown cheese is made from cow's milk and has a soft spreadable texture. Cream is added towards the end of the process. The semi-sweet taste is derived from caramelizing the milk sugars of the whey as it is made. 

Primost is made in the same way as Gjetost, but the whey mixture is not cooked as long. 
It is similar to  Brunost cheese, except that Gjetost is made from a combination of goat and cow's milk or strictly goat's milk. These caramelized cheeses are often served with dark bread or Norwegian flatbread, as a dessert cheese, or as a cheese melted into a variety of culinary dishes.

See also
 List of cheeses

References

Norwegian cheeses
Norwegian cuisine
Spreads (food)
Whey cheeses